The Rhyl Deanery is a Roman Catholic deanery in the Diocese of Wrexham that covers several churches in Conwy and Denbighshire.

The dean is centred at St Winefride Church in St Asaph.

Churches 
 St Therese of Lisieux, Abergele
 Christ the King, Towyn - served from Abergele
 St Joseph, Denbigh
 Ss Peter and Frances, Prestatyn
 Our Lady of the Assumption, Rhyl
 Our Lady Help of Christians, Ruthin
 St Winefride, St Asaph
 St Illtyd, Rhuddlan - served from St Asaph
 St Beuno, Tremeirchion - served by the Jesuits

Gallery

References

External links
 Diocese of Wrexham site
 St Joseph Church site
 Our Lady of the Assumption Church site
 St Beuno’s Ignatian Spirituality Centre site

Roman Catholic Deaneries in the Diocese of Wrexham